Neso , also known as Neptune XIII, is the outermost known natural satellite of Neptune. It is a retrograde irregular moon discovered by Matthew J. Holman, Brett J. Gladman, et al. on August 14, 2002, though it went unnoticed until 2003. Neso orbits Neptune at a distance of more than 48 Gm (million km), making it (as of 2015) the most distant known moon of any planet. At apocenter, the satellite is more than 72 Gm from Neptune. This distance is great enough that it exceeds Mercury's aphelion, which is approximately 70 Gm from the Sun.

Neso is also the moon with the longest orbital period, 26.67 years. It follows a retrograde, highly inclined, and highly eccentric orbit illustrated on the diagram in relation to other irregular satellites of Neptune. The satellites above the horizontal axis are prograde, the satellites beneath it are retrograde. The yellow segments extend from the pericentre to the apocentre, showing the eccentricity.

Given the similarity of the orbit's parameters with Psamathe (S/2003 N 1), it was suggested that both irregular satellites could have a common origin in the break-up of a larger moon.

Neso is named after one of the Nereids. Before it was officially named on February 3, 2007 (IAUC 8802), Neso was known by its provisional designation, S/2002 N 4.

See also 
 List of natural satellites

References 

 MPC: Natural Satellites Ephemeris Service
 Mean orbital parameters from JPL

External links 
 Matthew Holman's Neptune's page
 David Jewitt's pages
 Scott Sheppard's pages
 Neso in Fiction

Moons of Neptune
Irregular satellites
 
20020814
Moons with a retrograde orbit